Sir John Winfield Bonser,  (24 October 1847 – 9 December 1914) was a British colonial judge. He served as the 17th Chief Justice of Ceylon for almost 10 years.

Early life
Bonser was the son of Reverend John Bonser.  He was born in Walsham, Norfolk, in 1847.

Bonser was educated at Ashby Grammar School, Loughborough Grammar School, Heath Grammar School admitted October 1863, and Christ's College, Cambridge and Lincoln's Inn.

Legal career
He was Attorney General of the Straits Settlements between 1883 and 1893.  He was appointed Chief Justice of the Straits Settlements, in 1893, on the untimely death from cholera of the incumbent Chief Justice, Elliot Bovill.  He soon transferred to Ceylon where he served as Chief Justice of Ceylon from 1893 to 1902. He was knighted in 1894.

He was appointed to the Privy Council on 11 June 1902, and sat as a Member of Judicial Committee of the Privy Council from 1902 onwards.

Marriage
Bonser married Mary Catherine Colville, daughter of Colonel Hon. Sir William James Colville and Georgiana Mary Montagu Baillie, on 19 April 1899.

Death
Bonser died in London, England in December 1914.

References 

 

1847 births
1914 deaths
People educated at Loughborough Grammar School
People educated at Heath Grammar School
Alumni of Christ's College, Cambridge
Knights Bachelor
Members of the Judicial Committee of the Privy Council
Chief Justices of British Ceylon
Chief Justices of the Straits Settlements
Straits Settlements judges
Members of the Privy Council of the United Kingdom